Log is a former settlement in the Municipality of Moravče in central Slovenia. It is now part of the village of Gora pri Pečah. The area is part of the traditional region of Upper Carniola. The municipality is now included in the Central Slovenia Statistical Region.

Geography
Log lies in the northwestern part of Gora pri Pečah, on the north slope of Slivna Hill.

History
Log had a population of 19 living in three houses in 1900. Log was annexed by Gora pri Pečah (at that time still called Gora svetega Florjana) in 1952, ending its existence as an independent settlement.

References

External links

Log on Geopedia

Populated places in the Municipality of Moravče
Former settlements in Slovenia